Swen Swenson (January 23, 1930 - June 23, 1993) was a Broadway dancer and singer. Born in Inwood, Iowa, Swenson was trained by dancer Mira Rostova and at the School of American Ballet.

Openly gay, he had featured and co-starring roles on Broadway in such musicals such as Wildcat with Lucille Ball, Little Me (for which he received a Tony Award nomination, and in which he introduced the standard "I've Got Your Number"), A Joyful Noise, Annie, No, No Nanette, I Remember Mama and the 1981 revival of Can-Can.  He appeared in movies and on television variety shows, including Your Show of Shows and The Ed Sullivan Show.

Swenson died in 1993 of AIDS-related illness.

References

External links
 

1932 births
1993 deaths
American male musical theatre actors
AIDS-related deaths in California
American gay actors
American LGBT singers
LGBT dancers
20th-century American male actors
Male actors from Iowa
Singers from Iowa
American gay musicians
People from Lyon County, Iowa
American male film actors
American male television actors
School of American Ballet alumni
American male ballet dancers
20th-century American singers
LGBT people from Iowa
20th-century American male singers
20th-century American LGBT people
20th-century American ballet dancers